The 2026 Canadian census is the next scheduled detailed enumeration of the Canadian population. It follows the 2021 Canadian census, which recorded a population of 36,991,981.

See also 
Demographics of Canada
Statistics Act

References 

Canada
Census
Censuses in Canada